Vaganovo is a rural locality (village), part of the Rakhyinskoye Urban Settlement of the Vsevolozhsky District in Leningrad Oblast in Russia.

The military base Vaganovo-2 is located near the village, and is home to the 1489th Guards Anti-Aircraft Rocket Regiment.

References 

Rural localities in Leningrad Oblast